Eva Virginia Runefelt (born 1953) is a Swedish novelist and poet. She made her literary debut in 1975, with the novel I svackan. Her poetry collections include En kommande tid av livet from 1975 and Mjuka mörkret from 1997. She was awarded the Dobloug Prize in 1994. She won De Nio Lyrical Prize in 2008 and the Tranströmerpriset in 2018.

References

1953 births
Living people
20th-century Swedish novelists
20th-century Swedish poets
20th-century Swedish dramatists and playwrights
Dobloug Prize winners
Swedish women poets
20th-century Swedish women writers
21st-century Swedish novelists
21st-century Swedish poets
21st-century Swedish dramatists and playwrights
21st-century Swedish women writers
Swedish women novelists
Swedish women dramatists and playwrights